The 2005 Cotton Bowl Classic was a post-season college football bowl game between the Tennessee Volunteers and the Texas A&M Aggies on January 1, 2005, at the Cotton Bowl in Dallas, Texas. It was the final game of the 2004 NCAA Division I FBS football season for each team and resulted in a 38–7 Tennessee victory. Tennessee represented the Southeastern Conference (SEC) while Texas A&M represented the Big 12 Conference.

Game summary
Tennessee was up 38–0 before A&M scored late to make the final score 38-7 as A&M turned the ball over 5 times (4 on fumbles) and Rick Clausen went 18 of 27 for 222 yards. McNeal went 23 of 38 for 241 yards and set a new school single-season passing yards record, but only had one touchdown while throwing an interception.

References

Cotton Bowl Classic
Cotton Bowl Classic
Tennessee Volunteers football bowl games
Texas A&M Aggies football bowl games
January 2005 sports events in the United States
2005 in sports in Texas
2000s in Dallas
2005 in Texas